Søfteland or Syfteland is a village in Bjørnafjorden municipality in Vestland county, Norway.

References

Villages in Vestland
Bjørnafjorden